Tevita Silifou "David" Palu (born 6 September 1981 in Auckland, New Zealand) is a New Zealand rugby union footballer. He plays the position of fly-half and is currently playing for RC Timişoara in the Romanian Rugby Championship.

External links
 RC Timişoara

1981 births
Living people
New Zealand rugby union players
Rugby union fly-halves
New Zealand expatriate rugby union players
New Zealand sportspeople of Tongan descent
Expatriate rugby union players in Romania
New Zealand expatriate sportspeople in Romania
Rugby union players from Auckland